Estratos de Pupunahue is the name given to the sedimentary strata of Oligocene-Miocene age that crop out in Pupunahue and Mulpún near Valdivia, Chile. Outside this locality Estratos de Pupunahue extends below the surface over a larger area. The thickness of the strata varies from a few meters to 530 meters. The strata were initially described by  Henning Illies.
The strata are made up of conglomerate, sandstone and mudstone (Chilean Spanish: fangolita). The clast of the conglomerates are made up of metamorphic rock and the disposition of the conglomerates varies from clast-supported to matrix-supported.  The sandstone and mudstone contain layers of lignite coal that exceed 30 cm in thickness.

Coal layers found in the Estratos de Pupunahue have been exploited in the mines of Catamutún, Pupunahue and Mulpún ("Mulpun Beds"). 

The strata are very similar to the Cheuquemó Formation found further north, with the sole difference that the fossil assemblage in both seems to indicate different ages. While Cheuquemó Formation is possibly about 14 million years old (Miocene), Estratos de Pupunahue are 35–25 million years old.

See also 
 Coal mining in Chile

References 

Geologic formations of Chile
Paleogene Chile
Neogene Chile
Miocene Series of South America
Oligocene Series of South America
Eocene Series of South America
Coal formations
Conglomerate formations
Mudstone formations
Sandstone formations
Geology of Los Ríos Region
Geology of Los Lagos Region
Coal in Chile